Červená hora (meaning "Red Mountain") is a flat geological formation in the Nízký Jeseník mountain range in Moravia, the Czech Republic. A hydrometeorological station and a station of the European Fireball Network at the same time is located here.

See also
 Earth-grazing meteoroid of 13 October 1990

References

Mountains and hills of the Czech Republic